The West Bengal Board of Primary Education is the state government administered autonomous authority for overseeing primary education in West Bengal, India.

West Bengal Board of Primary Education conducts West Best Primary Teacher Eligibility Test.

Schools

Schools in Kolkata

Malaviya Vidyalaya

Malaviya Vidyalaya is one of the oldest schools in the city of Kolkata, and functions under the guidance of Kolkata Primary School Council.  The campus is located in Khidirpur. It is a co-educational school founded on 25 December 1955, in the memory of Bharat Ratna recipient 'Mahamana' Pandit Madan Mohan Malaviya.

See also 
Department of School Education (West Bengal)
West Bengal Board of Secondary Education

References

External links

West Bengal Board of Primary Education

Education in West Bengal
State secondary education boards of India
1990 establishments in West Bengal
State agencies of West Bengal
Educational boards based in Kolkata
Primary education
Government agencies established in 1990